Switzerland competed at the 2002 Winter Paralympics in Salt Lake City, United States. 18 competitors from Switzerland won 12 medals including 6 gold, 4 silver and 2 bronze and finished 7th in the medal table.

See also 
 Switzerland at the Paralympics
 Switzerland at the 2002 Winter Olympics

References 

2002
2002 in Swiss sport
Nations at the 2002 Winter Paralympics